Poongkothai Chandrahasan (born 1980) is a Sri Lankan filmmaker and activist. She starred in award-winning cinematographer P. C. Sriram's 2004 movie, Vaanam Vasappadum, India's first film shot in digital high definition format.

Early life
She was born in Colombo, Sri Lanka, the daughter of Samuel Chelvanayakam Chandrahasan and Anne Nirmala née Naganathan. Her family moved to India in 1983, when she was three. She studied at the Sacred Heart convent, and earned a BA in English and a Masters in Communication, and a diploma in film making. She interned at Kronkite and Ward in Washington D.C. and apprenticed under P. C. Sreeram during the making of Vaanam Vasappadum and Chetan Shah.

Chandrahasan is the granddaughter of S. J. V. Chelvanayakam, a Sri Lankan politician and leader of the Federal Party (TULF). Her maternal grandfather, Dr. E. M. V. Naganathan, was a senator and the Secretary of the Federal Party. E. M. V. Naganathan is a descendant of the royal families of Jafna.

Career
Chandrahasan wrote and directed feature-length documentaries and documentary shorts, telecast on international channels. These include Refugees to the Rescue, Sri Lanka Struggling to Stay Afloat, in the Aftermath of the Waves and My Island is Bleeding. Her films are usually political in nature, with a focus on human rights.

Chandrahasan works on social causes. She began working with the refugee community in 2004, and is a resource for OfERR, an NGO founded by her father in 1984. She works mainly with women and children in the refugee community.

Chandrahasan organised and curated an exhibition named 'Sunshine in a Tear Drop', displaying refugee children's drawings. 500 refugee children (between the ages of five to fifteen) from the 117 refugee camps in India took part. As topics she selected 'My Life so Far' and 'An Incident that Affected Me' and 'Peace'. In an interview with Deccan Chronicle she stated: "Our main aim with this exhibition is to spread awareness about the innocent people suffering because of the war. All we get to see is the political side of the war. But what about the human loss?" After narrowing the submissions to 25, Chandrahasan and an Indian photographer visited refugee camps and photographed the children. The exhibition of the drawings, photographs and a fifty word piece by each child formed the exhibit. "The news talks of so many tigers killed, so many soldiers killed, but we forget the human face of starving civilians, children losing their parents and worse", she explained. "What began as a competition for an international exhibition is now a statement by these children. The war, to them, is not an abstraction. These are the stories of their sufferings, their personal tales of loss."

Chandrahasan supports homeless pet adoption and has spoken out against the pet trade. Her rescue dog Bambi appears in PETA's "Adopt a Homeless Dog" advertisements alongside movie star Trisha Krishnan.

See also 
S. J. V. Chelvanayakam
E. M. V. Naganathan

References

External links 
 
 
 
 
 
  
 
  
  – royal families of Jaffna website

1980 births
Living people
Sri Lankan Hindus
Sri Lankan Tamil actresses